The large moth family Crambidae contains the following genera beginning with "G":

References 

Lists of Lepidoptera genera
 G